Greatest Hits is a greatest hits album by British-American rock band Fleetwood Mac, released on 15 November 1988 by Warner Bros. Records. It covers the period of the band's greatest commercial success, from the mid-1970s to the late-1980s.

It is different from the similarly titled 1971 release by the Peter Green incarnation of the band and contains a different track listing. The 1988 album draws only on recordings from after Stevie Nicks and Lindsey Buckingham joined the group in 1975, omitting earlier hits such as "Albatross" and "Oh Well".

The album has proven to be a major success since the time of its release. It peaked at number 14 on the US Billboard 200 and sold steadily over the years since its release, and has to date been certified 8× platinum for shipping eight million copies there. In the United Kingdom, it reached number three upon release and has returned several times to the UK album chart and has been certified triple platinum for shipping 900,000 copies there. In both the US and the UK, the album has returned to the album charts as recently as 2017.

Background
The album contains two new tracks, "As Long as You Follow" (which was released as a single to promote the album), and "No Questions Asked". The track listing for the US release differs slightly from that of other territories. It includes the 1975 track "Over My Head" but omits the 1987 track "Seven Wonders" (despite it being a top 20 hit in the US) as well as the 1982 track "Oh Diane" (which failed to chart there in 1983, but was a top-ten hit in the UK).

A number of sources state that this album was the last to be commercially released as an 8-track tape by a major label.

Track listing

US release
"Rhiannon" from Fleetwood Mac (Stevie Nicks) – 4:11
"Don't Stop" from Rumours (Christine McVie) – 3:12
"Go Your Own Way" from Rumours (Lindsey Buckingham) – 3:38
"Hold Me" from Mirage (C. McVie, Robbie Patton) – 3:45
"Everywhere"  from Tango in the Night (C. McVie) – 3:42
"Gypsy" from Mirage (Nicks) – 4:24
"You Make Loving Fun" from Rumours (C. McVie) – 3:31
"As Long as You Follow" (previously unreleased) (C. McVie, Eddy Quintela) – 4:10*
"Dreams" from Rumours (Nicks) – 4:14
"Say You Love Me" from Fleetwood Mac (C. McVie) – 4:10
"Tusk" from Tusk (Buckingham) – 3:30
"Little Lies" from Tango in the Night (C. McVie, Quintela) – 3:38
"Sara" from Tusk (Nicks) – 6:22
"Big Love" from Tango in the Night (Buckingham) – 3:38
"Over My Head" from Fleetwood Mac (C. McVie) – 3:34
"No Questions Asked" (previously unreleased) (Nicks, Kelly Johnston) – 4:40*

One US reissue by WB as #R1 25801, does not include tracks 7, 14 or 15, and the order of the tracks on the back side is different.

European and Australian releases
"Rhiannon" – 4:11
"Go Your Own Way" – 3:37
"Don't Stop" – 3:11
"Gypsy" – 4:22
"Everywhere" – 3:41
"You Make Loving Fun" – 3:31
"Big Love" – 3:38
"As Long as You Follow" – 4:11*
"Say You Love Me" – 4:09
"Dreams" – 4:15
"Little Lies" – 3:37
"Oh Diane" from Mirage (Buckingham, Richard Dashut) – 2:33
"Sara" – 6:25
"Tusk" – 3:26
"Seven Wonders" from Tango in the Night (Sandy Stewart, Nicks) – 3:33
"Hold Me" – 3:44
"No Questions Asked" – 4:41*

 "As Long as You Follow" and "No Questions Asked" were new tracks at the time of the album's release. The former was released as a single to promote the album in December 1988, peaking at No. 66 in the UK and No. 43 in the US. "Hold Me" was also re-released in the UK with "No Questions Asked" as its B-side in February 1989.
 "You Make Loving Fun", "Big Love", "Oh Diane" and "Seven Wonders" are not included on the UK vinyl version, but are included on the cassette and CD formats. The LP contained 13 tracks.

Personnel
Fleetwood Mac
Lindsey Buckingham – lead and backing vocals, guitars, additional keyboards, percussion, banjo ("Say You Love Me")
Stevie Nicks – lead and backing vocals, additional keyboards ("Sara")
Billy Burnette – backing vocals, guitar ("As Long as You Follow" and "No Questions Asked")
Rick Vito – backing vocals, guitar ("As Long as You Follow" and "No Questions Asked")
Christine McVie – lead and backing vocals, keyboards, synthesizer
John McVie – bass guitar
Mick Fleetwood – drums, percussion

Charts

Weekly charts

Year-end charts

Certifications

References 

1988 greatest hits albums
Fleetwood Mac compilation albums
Warner Records compilation albums